Test film are rolls or loops or slides of photographic film used for testing the quality of equipment.  Equipment to be tested could include: telecine, motion picture film scanner, Movie projectors, Image scanners, film-out gear, Film recorders and Film scanners.

Test films comes in all film formats: 16mm, 35mm, Super 8, 8mm, 65mm, 70mm and IMAX, both motion pictures and still photography.

China girl
China girl or leader ladies or LAD girl or laboratory aim density (LAD) test film, is common name for a color chart test film with a color or black-and-white set up chart and a woman. This would be used stand alone or placed on a film leader, that is at the start of the first roll of film. LAD patch is neutral gray, with visual density of 1.0. With the LAD patch is usually a white and black patch for white balancing FILMS.

Color patches of blue, green, and red are used to check saturated colors. Grayscale chips are used to check for neutral color balance and correct contrast. While the face is used for color correct flesh tones, LAD film is a few frames or a loop of correctly exposed and processed negative film that is used by a film laboratory to set-up their analyzers. This is to ensure that the duplication and printing processes of the film is correct.

Types
Resolution – Focus
Registration and Geometry
Framing and Aspect ratio
Negative pulldown – 2, 3 or 4 perforation
Color grading
TAF – Telecine Analysis Film (Kodak Telecine tool kit)
Steadiness  – Film perforations test
Streaking or after glow
Keykode – film frame number test
Optical sound focus
Optical sound buzz (centered audio pick)
Magnetic sound
Dolby tone sound

Manufactures
(past and current):
SMPTE -Society of Motion Picture and Television Engineers
Kodak
Fujifilm
D.E.L. test film  
BBC and Channel 4 UK
European Broadcasting Union – EBU
International Electrotechnical Commission – IEC
ARRI
Fernseh – Broadcast Television Systems Inc.
Dolby (Audio only)

See also
 Testcard for TV and Computer monitor
 List of BBC test cards
 List of film topics (Extensive alphabetical listing)
 SMPTE colour bars
 Film analysis
 SMPTE Universal Leader
 Digital Picture Exchange
 1951 USAF resolution test chart
 Optical resolution
 Snellen chart
 List of monochrome and RGB palettes
 Indexed color
 Color Lookup Table
 Computer display
 Grayscale
 3D LUT
 Glossary of video terms

Images

References 

 smpte.org Test Materials
aig-imaging.com, Resolution| Digital Science TL5003 Scanner Test Chart| QA-60 
ericmojo.com, photo of a Kodak TAF film
engineering.de Test Film by number
 Feminism, Issues, Movies, China Girls, January 30th, 2009, By Chelsea Spear

External links
 SMPTE's official website

Film and video technology
Film and video terminology
Audiovisual ephemera